Arcfox (极狐) is a Chinese marque of electric passenger cars and crossovers based in Beijing, operating since 2017. The brand belongs to the car manufacturer BAIC Group. The brand's vehicles are produced by BAIC Bluepark Magna Automobile Co., Ltd., a 51-49 joint venture plant held by BAIC Bluepark and Magna International in Zhenjiang.

History
In 2017, the Chinese automotive giant BAIC Group decided to create a new brand dedicated to the development of electric cars. The first model to go on sale locally was a microcar called Lite, targeting the premium class.

In March 2019, at the Geneva Motor Show, the global premiere of the Arcfox brand took place, expressing the goals of developing the Chinese brand's operations also on the European continent.

The structures presented under the Arcfox brand in Europe were completely different from the concept of the Lite model. The first vehicle was the prototype of a large ECF SUV, the stylistic design of which was the responsibility of designer Walter de Silva, known for his work for the Volkswagen Group.

The second vehicle that participated in the world premiere of the Arcfox brand was the GT supercar, which was to present the possibilities of the designers of the BAIC Group. The vehicle was presented in both the basic and the special variant called Race Edition.

Vehicles 
Arcfox Lite
Arcfox Alpha-T
Arcfox Alpha-S
Arcfox GT

References

External links 

 Official website (in English)

BAIC Group divisions and subsidiaries
Car brands
Chinese brands
Electric vehicle manufacturers of China
Chinese companies established in 2017
Vehicle manufacturing companies established in 2017